Charles Smith (b Huntingdon, 11 May 1844; d Cambridge 13 November 1916) was a 20th-century British academic.

Smith was educated at Sidney Sussex College, Cambridge. He became a Fellow of Sidney Sussex in 1868; Tutor in 1875; and Master in 1890. He was Vice-Chancellor of the University of Cambridge from 1895 to 1897.

References 

1844 births
1916 deaths
Alumni of Sidney Sussex College, Cambridge
Vice-Chancellors of the University of Cambridge
Fellows of Sidney Sussex College, Cambridge
Masters of Sidney Sussex College, Cambridge
English mathematicians
People from Huntingdon